Grahana (meaning: Eclipse) is a novel written by S.L. Bhyrappa, which was first published in 1972. As of May 2018, it had 11 reprints.

References

Kannada novels
1972 novels
1972 Indian novels
Novels by S. L. Bhyrappa